Bruno Philip Haas (May 5, 1891 – June 5, 1952) was a Major League Baseball pitcher, minor league baseball executive, and a pro football player in the NFL. His baseball career lasted 37 years.

At Worcester Academy, he met Roy McGillicuddy, the son of Connie Mack, and a month after his graduation, he joined the Philadelphia Athletics. He is most remembered for setting an American League record (tying the major league record held by Bill George and George Van Haltren) for most batters walked in one game with 15. He did this in his major league debut on June 23,  for the Philadelphia Athletics. Following his inauspicious debut, Haas pitched in just five more major league games, all in 1915. He played in six other games, three as an outfielder and three as a pinch-hitter.

A year later he played for the Cleveland Indians of the National Football League and is one only a few athletes to have played in both Major League Baseball and NFL. Haas also played tailback in the National Football League with the Akron Pros, Cleveland Tigers and Dayton Triangles.

After his major league baseball career, Haas continued to play in the minor leagues until 1938, including a twelve-year stint with the St. Paul Saints from 1920 until 1931, during which he mostly played in the outfield. In 1933, he helped to found the fourth incarnation of the Northern League, joining the Winnipeg Maroons for the rest of his playing career. He also managed the Maroons from 1933-35.

After his retirement as a player, Haas continued to work in baseball. He managed a number of different teams between 1939 and 1950, and in 1951 he returned to the Athletics to work as a scout. Haas died on June 5, 1952.

References

Sources

Pro Football Reference: Bruno Haas

1891 births
1952 deaths
Major League Baseball pitchers
Philadelphia Athletics players
Philadelphia Athletics scouts
Wilkes-Barre Barons (baseball) players
Newark Bears (IL) players
Milwaukee Brewers (minor league) players
St. Paul Saints (AA) players
Toledo Mud Hens players
Minneapolis Millers (baseball) players
Des Moines Demons players
New Orleans Pelicans (baseball) players
Winnipeg Maroons (baseball) players
Grand Forks Chiefs players
Fargo-Moorhead Twins players
Baseball players from Worcester, Massachusetts
Minor league baseball managers
Baseball executives
Players of American football from Worcester, Massachusetts
Akron Pros players
Cleveland Indians (NFL) players
Dayton Triangles players
Worcester Academy alumni